The nine auspicious Thai desserts are used for traditional ceremonies such as weddings or housewarmings, because of their good meaning (the word “gao” which means “nine” in Thai and also signifies prosperity). 

Most of the dessert names include the word Thong, which means gold in Thai, a symbol of wealth and prosperity.

Thong Yip 

Thong Yip is made from egg yolks and flour, then cooked in a syrup (sugar stewed in jasmine-scented water); each piece is moulded into the shape of a five-pointed star, and then placed in a China cup to set.

In Thai, the word thong means "gold" and yip means "to pick".

Thong Yot 
Thong Yot is described as a sister of Thong Yip, due to the similarity in ingredients used even though the form is different. Thong Yot means "golden drop". It augurs wealth for the person who is served it.

Foi thong 
Foi thong uses the same ingredients as thong yip and thong yot. Foi thong means "golden noodle" or "golden yarn". It bestows long lasting love and life. It is usually used in Thai wedding ceremonies to bless the bride and groom.

Thong ek (or Thong ek Krajang) 

Thong ek is made of the same ingredients as Foi thong, carved in the shape of a flower. It is said to be the most difficult and beautiful dessert of the thong desserts. Thong ek means "the one and only", "tops", "the best". It is conveys a blessing for a fruitful career.

Med khanun (or Met Khanun)
Met khanun is made from mashed green bean coated with egg yolks. The name Med Khanun comes from its shape, which looks like jackfruit (Khanun) seed (Med). It symbolizes the support one will receive in one's career and in life.

Cha mongkut
Cha mongkut is a dessert made from incense-scented flour, bean flour, sugar, coconut milk, and roasted watermelon seed which looks like "Kalamae" invented 200 years ago in the era of King Rama II. Cha mongkut means the "owner of the crown", the top position.

There is confusion between cha mongkut and Dara thong. Dara thong is a crown-like dessert made of flour, egg yolk, sugar, gold leaf, roasted watermelon seeds, and jasmine-scented water, invented by Dame Jue Nakornrachaseni around 1938.

Khanom sane chan
The ingredients of Khanom sane chan are two kinds of flour, eggs, coconut milk, sugar, and nutmeg. Named after a fruit called "Luk chan". Saneh chan means "charming Chan". It assures the receiver of love, adoration, and charm, mostly used in wedding ceremonies.

Khanom chan

Khanom chan consists of tapioca flour, rice flour, arrowroot flour, coconut milk, sugar, and jasmine-scented water. In the past it was arranged into a rose shape, but the most common shape is stacking each layer together into nine layers. Kanom chan literally means "layered dessert". It symbolizes success and advancement.

Thuai fu
Thuai fu is made of flour, sugar, yeast, and jasmine-scented water. Thuai fu is named after its shape. It means "rising bowl" which symbolizes improvement in life and career

See also
 List of Thai desserts
 Thai cuisine § Desserts and sweets

References

Thai cuisine
Thai culture
Thai desserts and snacks